P2P may refer to:

 Pay to play, where money is exchanged for services
 Peer-to-peer, a distributed application architecture in computing or networking 
 List of P2P protocols
 Phenylacetone, an organic compound commonly known as P2P
 Point-to-point (telecommunications), a communications connection between two communication endpoints or nodes
 Pollen Street Secured Lending, formerly P2P Global Investments, a British investment trust
 Premium Point-to-Point Bus Service, in the Philippines
 Procure-to-pay, software systems for procurement business processes
 Purchase-to-pay, business process in procurement
 Social peer-to-peer processes, interactions with a peer-to-peer dynamic

See also

Peer-to-peer (disambiguation)
Point-to-point (disambiguation)
People to People Student Ambassador Program, a cultural and educational travel program for students
Pier to Pub, an Australian open water swimming race